The Mentone Springs Hotel was a hotel in Mentone, Alabama.  It was the last remaining large-scale resort hotel in Alabama from the late 19th century.  The hotel burned to the ground after an electrical fire on March 1, 2014.

History
The hotel was built from 1884 to 1887 by J. Frank Caldwell, a physician from Pennsylvania who had vacationed in the area.  On the property are two springs, Mineral Springs and Beauty Springs.  The hotel and town were named after the French resort town of Menton.  The area gained in popularity among tourists in the 1890s, due largely to the cooler temperatures and scenery of the Ridge-and-Valley Appalachians.  In 1915 the hotel was renovated and an annex built, adding 27 rooms.  Through the Great Depression to the 1970s, the hotel went into decline, saddled with debt and bouncing between owners.  It ceased operating in 1950 and was later converted to a private residence and organ repair shop.  The hotel reopened in 2001, and underwent an extensive restoration in 2010–11.  An antique store occupied the 1915 annex.

References 

National Register of Historic Places in DeKalb County, Alabama
Bed and breakfasts in Alabama
Hotel buildings completed in 1887
Buildings and structures demolished in 2014
Burned hotels in the United States
Demolished buildings and structures in Alabama
Defunct hotels in the United States